John William Hamer (born 12 September 1984) is an English former competitive figure skater. He is a three-time British national champion (2005–07). His best result at an ISU Championship was 19th at the 2005 European Championships.

Career

Early years 
Hamer started skating relatively late, at age 11. His mother, who had skated during childhood, chose the activity as part of her rehabilitation following a road traffic accident. Her son came with her to the Gillingham Ice rink and, after five weeks of group lessons, he signed up for private lessons with Gary Jones, who would coach him for his whole career.

Competitive career 
Hamer began his competitive skating career in 1996 at the age of 12. He competed on the novice level at the 1999 British Championships and placed first on the junior level at the 2003 Championships. In 2001, Hamer appeared at the Mladost Trophy in Zagreb, Croatia and achieved the highest score among the British males. He went on to take part in two ISU Junior Grand Prix events.

In the 2004–05 season, Hamer became the British senior men's champion and was selected for the 2005 European Championships in Turin, Italy. Placing 20th in the short program, he qualified for the free skate and finished 19th overall. A month later, he travelled to Moscow for the 2005 World Championships but did not reach the free skate.

Hamer repeated as British champion during the next two seasons. He did not advance past the short program at the European and World Championships in 2006 but was successful at the 2007 European Championships in Warsaw, Poland. He retired from competition after the event. Although Gary Jones was his main coach, Hamer also worked with Michael Jiranek and Rinata Jiranek (2005), Tatiana Tarasova (2006), and Texas-based Lorraine Borman (2006).

Show and coaching career
After leaving competition, Hamer spent three years performing with the Russian Ice Stars. In February 2011, he began coaching at Alexandra Palace ice rink in North London. He teaches skaters of all ages and levels of experience and specialises in jumping.

Programs

Competitive highlights

References

External links
 
 John Hamer, coach at Alexandra Palace Official Facebook Page
 

British male single skaters
English male single skaters
1984 births
Living people
People from Gillingham, Kent